Jorhat Stadium is a multi-purpose stadium located in Jorhat, Assam. This is the oldest stadium of Assam with the capacity of 12,000 spectators. It has earthen galleries which were designed by late Abani Mohan Choudhury. The stadium is venue for cricket and football tournaments. The first Ranji Trophy match in Assam was held at Jorhat Stadium in 1949/50.

The coveted major tournament A.T.P.A. Shield is the biggest attraction of football in Jorhat, with top teams from the Northeast and rest of country. The tournament was first held at this stadium in 1960. It is the home ground of local professional football club Jorhat Town Club that play in Assam State Premier League.

See also 

 Jorhat District Sports Association Ground
 Jorhat Gymkhana Club

References

External links 
 Cricinfo
 Cricketarchive
 Jorhat Stadium
 Wikimapia

Cricket grounds in Assam
Football venues in Assam
Multi-purpose stadiums in India
Sports venues in Assam
Jorhat
1950 establishments in Assam